Julia Kaufmann (born 1984) is a German voice actress. She has dubbed over a number of actresses, including Scarlett Johansson, Mischa Barton, and Elisha Cuthbert.

Roles

Television animation
Avatar: The Last Airbender (Katara (Mae Whitman) (seasons 1 & 2 & opening narration))
Earth Maiden Arjuna (Jiyuna Ariyoshi (Mami Higashiyama))
Elfen Lied (Yuka (Mamiko Noto))
Neon Genesis Evangelion (Misato Katsuragi (Kotono Mitsuishi))
X (Satsuki Yatōji (Hōko Kuwashima))

Dubbing roles
7th Heaven (Sandy Jameson (Haylie Duff))
Charmed (Billie Jenkins (Kaley Cuoco))
Home Alone 3 (Molly Pruitt (Scarlett Johansson))
Joan of Arcadia (Joan Girardi (Amber Tamblyn))
Marie Antoinette (Marie-Louise, princesse de Lamballe (Mary Nighy))
Material Girls (Ava Marchetta (Haylie Duff))
New York Minute (Roxy Ryan (Mary-Kate Olsen))
The O.C. (Lindsay Wheeler-Gardner (Shannon Lucio))
The Quiet (Nina Deer (Elisha Cuthbert))
Sin City (Becky (Alexis Bledel))
Skipped Parts (Maurey Pierce (Mischa Barton))

External links
Julia Kaufmann at the German Dubbing Card Index

 

1984 births
German voice actresses
Living people